The Lion Building is an office building and the seat of the diplomatic missions of the Socialist Republic of Vietnam and the former seat of the Republic of South Sudan to the United States. It is located at 1233 20th Street Northwest, Washington, D.C., in the Dupont Circle neighborhood.

Vietnam

The embassy of the Socialist Republic of Vietnam is located at 1233 20th Street, Suite 400.

The ambassador's residence is at 2251 R Street, Northwest, Washington, D.C.

The embassy also operates a Consulate-General in San Francisco.
The ambassador is Hà Kim Ngọc.

List of ambassadors
Le Van Bang (1995–2001)
Nguyen Tam Chien (2001–2007)
Le Cong Phung (2007–2011)
Nguyen Quoc Cuong (2011-2014)
Phạm Quang Vinh (2014-2018)
Hà Kim Ngọc (2018-present)

South Sudan
The embassy of the Republic of South Sudan was located at 1233 20th Street N.W. Suite 602. However, it has since been moved to 1015 31st Street NW, Suite 300 per the website.

See also
United States–Vietnam relations
South Sudan–United States relations

References

External links
Vietnamese embassy official website
South Sudanese embassy official website

Vietnam
Washington, D.C.
United States–Vietnam relations
Washington, D.C.
South Sudan–United States relations
Dupont Circle